Samuel Madden (23 December 1686 – 31 December 1765) was an Irish author. His works include Themistocles; The Lover of His Country, Reflections and Resolutions Proper for the Gentlemen of Ireland, and Memoirs of the Twentieth Century. Dr. Samuel Johnson wrote of him, "His was a name which Ireland ought to honour". He suggested that the Royal Dublin Society initiate a scheme to fund improvements in agriculture and arts in Ireland via the use of premiums – the source of his nickname Premium.

Biography

Rev. Samuel Madden, D.D., commonly called "Premium" Madden, was born on 23 December 1686 in Dublin, Ireland. His father was John Madden, and his mother was Mary Molyneux.

In 1729, he wrote a tragedy entitled Themistocles, the Lover of His Country.

In 1733, he wrote Memoirs of the Twentieth Century, one of the first science fiction novels. However, it was suppressed by Sir Robert Walpole, and is now very rare. A reprint of the original sheets appeared with Garland Publishing in 1972. The work was originally designed to have six volumes yet was discontinued after volume one.

In 1738, he wrote his most famous work, Reflections and Resolutions Proper for the Gentlemen of Ireland, in which he described the poor living conditions in Ireland at the time.

Samuel Madden died on 31 December 1765, at age 79. He married Jane McGill of Kirktown, County Armagh in 1765 and had ten children, including Samuel Molyneux Madden (died 1798), his heir. His descendants included Dodgson Hamilton Madden, scholar and High Court judge.

Works
Themistocles, The Lover of His Country. A Tragedy. As it is Acted at the Theatre-Royal, in Lincoln's-Inn-Fields (1729)
Memoirs of the Twentieth Century,: Being original letters of state under George the Sixth (1733)
Reflections and Resolutions Proper for the Gentlemen of Ireland, as to their Conduct for the Service of their Country, as Landlords, as Masters of Families, as Protestants, as Descended from British Ancestors, as Country Gentlemen and Farmers, as Justices of the Peace, as Merchants, as Members of Parliament (1738)
The reign of George VI. 1900–1925: A forecast written in the year 1763 (1763)
A Proposal for the General Encouragement of Learning in Trinity College (publication unknown)
Memoir of the life of the late Rev. Peter Roe: With copious extracts from his correspondence, diaries, and other remains (publication unknown)

References

Further reading
 Clarke, I. F. "The Reign of George VI: A Fantasy OF 1763." History Today (Dec 1963), Vol. 13 Issue 12, p830-837.

External links

Samuel Madden at libraryireland.com
A history of the Madden family

1686 births
1765 deaths
Irish non-fiction writers
Irish male non-fiction writers
People from County Dublin
18th-century Irish writers
18th-century Irish novelists
Irish male novelists
18th-century Irish male writers